State Route 647 (SR 647) is a state highway in Washoe County, Nevada. The route currently comprises a portion of West Fourth Street in Reno and a short segment of Prater Way in Sparks. The route previously extended a greater distance east–west through Reno–Sparks, and was formerly designated as part of U.S. Route 40.

Major intersections

See also

References

647
Interstate 80
U.S. Route 40
Transportation in Washoe County, Nevada
Transportation in Reno, Nevada
Sparks, Nevada